The Serie A Femenina de Ecuador is the highest amateur league of women's football in Ecuador. The competition is organised by the Ecuadorian Football Federation. Until 2013, the tournament was played by divisional selections and not clubs. After a restructuring in 2013 clubs contest the league title. The winner qualifies to the Copa Libertadores Femenina.

As of 2014 all teams are amateur and do not pay their players, the only exception is Rocafuerte which pays small amounts of money.

History 
The national championship was announced and first held 2006. It is open to representative teams of all provinces of Ecuador and not to clubs. In the first edition fifteen regions entered a team and eventually the Guayas selection finished on top of the Pichincha selection to become the first champions.

In 2013 the league was restructured and is only played by clubs since then. 16 teams were divided into four groups of four. The top two advance and then form two groups of four. The top two teams advance to the semi-finals. For the 2014 season, the twelve best placed teams of the 2013 season will build the first league while the four last placed teams will play in a new second division. Those divisions are called Serie A and Serie B and both start the 2014 season with twelve teams.

By 2014 the FEF committed to apply seminars by FIFA on female tournaments, on referees, coaching, directive, and players.

The 2016 season had to be postponed, because of monetary problems. Because of that the second stage was delayed until January 2017. The top four team of each of the two groups qualified to the second stage.

2014 teams
Serie A consists of twelve teams:

 Cruz del Sur - Tena
 Cumandá - Puyo
 Espuce - Quito
 Grupo Siete - Montecristi
 Las Palmas - Santo Domingo
 LDU Amateur - Quito
 Quito FC - Quito
 Rocafuerte - Guayaquil
 Siete de febrero - Babahoyo
 Unión - Babahoyo
 Unión Española - Guayaquil
 U. San Francisco - Quito

List of champions 
Below is the list of all champions.

References

External links 
Federation website

Football leagues in Ecuador
Ecuador
Recurring sporting events established in 2006
Women's sports leagues in Ecuador